The  (pronounced "High Ace") is a light commercial vehicle produced by the Japanese automobile manufacturer Toyota. First launched in October 1967, the HiAce has since been available in a wide range of body configurations, including a minivan/MPV, minibus, panel van, crew van, pickup truck, taxi and an ambulance. In Japan, the HiAce is exclusive to Toyopet Store locations.



First generation (H10; 1967) 

In the late 1960s, Toyota Auto Body, a Toyota subcontracting company, led the development of the HiAce as a small van with a  design, similar to European ones at the time, but, according to former Toyota senior employee Akira Kawahara, something unseen in the Japanese industry.

Introduced in 1967, the HiAce was offered as a cab over pick-up, delivery van, and a stretched commuter vehicle. It was also called the HiAce Commercial in camper van configuration. It was brought to market two years after the introduction of the Nissan Homy, acquired by Nissan when they assumed operations of the Prince Motor Company. A few engines of different sizes were available upon introduction, ranging from the  1.35 to a  1.6-litre version. In 1975, the 1.8-litre 16R engine was added. The HiAce was available with a heater, considered a luxury item at the time.

The HiAce was primarily designed as a commuter vehicle, able to transport up to 8 people. With this goal in consideration, the HiAce exterior dimensions and engine displacement were in compliance with Japanese government regulations so as to encourage sales, and accommodate the most passengers by utilizing a cabover body style, with the engine installed underneath and between the front passengers. It was a smaller alternative to the larger Toyota Coaster minibus, and was introduced to Japan after the 1950 Volkswagen Transporter, and the 1961 Chevrolet Greenbrier cabover vans. It was introduced in the same year as the much smaller Toyota MiniAce, which was based on the Toyota Publica, a predecessor to the Toyota Corolla.

This type of HiAce is a rare model these days mostly because of weather wear and rust. HiAce vans originally sold on the European market have largely been exported to Africa and to Southeast Asia where they are used as public transport vehicles.

Second generation (H11/H20/H30/H40; 1977) 

The new HiAce of 1977 featured a longer, and more streamlined cab with single headlights. As the second generations dimensions grew, it was joined by a smaller, junior-level cabover van called the Toyota LiteAce to continue to offer dimensions closer to the first generation. In addition to the petrol engines, a 2.2-litre diesel engine was offered in certain markets. New for the "20–40 series" HiAce was a double-cab pick-up, super-long-wheelbase van, and a super long, high-roof Commuter. The Commuter models can seat up to 15 passengers. The short wheelbase truck initially carried the "H11"-series chassis codes. For the vans, 20 series vans have short wheelbases, 30 series have long, and 40 series have super long wheelbases.

After the third generation was introduced in 1982, certain variants of the second generation such as the truck continued to be manufactured for several years. A majority of the second generation models were exported from Europe and Japan to African and Asian countries after production ended and are used as public transport vehicles.

Third generation (H50/H60/H70/H80/H90; 1982) 

A new HiAce van was launched in 1982, with the HiAce pickup truck coming in August 1985. The truck's cab design was common to the bigger ToyoAce light truck, though it had different frontal styling. The truck was a completely different model than the van.

The van's model number contains various wheelbase specification information: 50 series vans have short wheelbases, 60 series have long, and 70 series have super long. The pickup trucks are in the 80 and 90-series. The Toyota Mobile Lounge, displayed at the 1987 Tokyo Motor Show, is based on the HiAce high-roof Commuter. While the van and Commuter were redesigned in 1989, the pickup truck was produced until the 1995 model year, and was the last HiAce based pickup truck. Air-conditioning was offered as standard equipment on some variants from this generation onwards.

In South Africa, the vehicle continued to be produced and was sold alongside the H200 Toyota Quantum (introduced in 2005) until the end of 2007 when a Taxi variant of the Quantum was introduced.

Fourth generation (H100; 1989) 

The fourth generation model appeared in August 1989 and was available in standard wheelbase and long wheelbase variants; a Grand Cabin; standard wheelbase and long wheelbase van; long wheelbase and super long wheelbase high roof van. The latter shares a body design with the Commuter, which is a 15-seat minibus.

A range of engines were available in the fourth-generation vehicles, ranging from 2.0-litre petrol engines to 3.0-litre turbodiesel engines. The 2.4-litre turbodiesel engine (2L-T) was updated to the electronically controlled 2L-TE in October 1990. Most versions are rear-wheel drive, but part time or full-time four-wheel-drive versions were sold depending on specification level and market. Four-wheel drive models were initially only available with the 2.8-litre 3L diesel engine in the Japanese domestic market, but export markets received petrol options as well. The base model is typically the DX. Upmarket versions included GL, Super GL, Super Custom and Super Custom Limited models

The facelifted fourth-generation HiAce was launched in August 1993. At this time, the new 3-litre 1KZ-TE turbodiesel replaced the 2L-TE and 3L diesels in HiAce Wagons (passenger car registration) in Japan. The HiAce received a facelift again during 1997 and once more in 2002. In Japanese-market commercial HiAces the 2.8-litre 3L engine was replaced by the larger 5L engine in August 1998, in order to meet stricter emissions standards. The 1TR-FE engine was also introduced in September 2003. Export models were available with a range of different engines to suit local importers, uses, and tax structures.

In the Philippines, the HiAce was first sold in August 1990 with a diesel engine. The vehicle got revamped in October 1994 before it was launched in 1995. It was revamped again in May 1997 for sale as both a business vehicle and as a family vehicle. The HiAce was first then comes in two variants; the business-oriented 15-seater and the family van-oriented 13-seater. In March 1999, the HiAce 3.0 Grandia and 2.0 GL petrol HiAce variants were launched, as well as the HiAce Commuter, a HiAce meant for business, and the HiAce was facelifted again in that year. In September 2000, the top-of-the-line 3.0 inline-4 diesel HiAce Super Grandia was launched. All came with a standard 5-speed manual transmission. These variants were all sold until June 2005, with the next generation being launched in June of that same year. A special edition HiAce Super Grandia J (Japan edition) was also sold together with the RAV4 J and Revo J from August 2002 to June 2003.

In the UK market, the H100 Hiace was introduced in November 1989 with either a 2.0 1RZ petrol engine developing 74 kW at 5400 rpm and 165 Nm at 2600 rpm or the 2.4L 2L-II diesel developing 57 kW at 3900 rpm and 162 Nm at 2400 rpm. A short wheelbase variant called the Hiace Compact was introduced in 1994 as a replacement for the Liteace van.

A special model intended to be used as an emergency medical vehicle known as the Toyota HiMedic, was launched in May 1992 with sales commencing from June of the same year. It used a 4.0-litre V8 engine shared with the Celsior.

RegiusAce 
The HiAce was rebadged with a luxury orientation, called the Toyota RegiusAce. It was introduced in August 1999 with different versions called the Regius HiAce and Regius Touring HiAce sold at Toyopet and Vista dealerships. The RegiusAce uses a cab-over layout, where the front seat passengers sit above the front axle and the engine is beneath the floor, between the front passengers.

When the Vista sales network was replaced by the NETZ sales network, the RegiusAce was sold exclusively at the Netz Store. The H100 series RegiusAce was manufactured between 1999 and 2004.

China 
The HiAce (H100) also remains popular in China, where it is still produced by several Chinese vehicle manufacturers such as Jinbei Motors as the Jinbei Haise since 1991, King Long Motors since 1995 as the Golden Dragon XML6532 since 2000. These are exported to several markets, including Chile, and are also assembled in both Egypt (by Bavarian Auto Group) and Sri Lanka (as the Micro MPV J). Common engines found in Chinese HiAce variants are the 2.0 and 2.2-litre (491Q-ME) petrol engines and the 2.8-litre 4JB1 diesel engine. A Chinese variant of the 2.4 L 2RZ-E engine is also available known as the 4RB2. 

Other petrol engines such as the V19 (2 litre), 4G20C (2 litre) and the 4G22 (2.2 litre), as well as 2.5 and 2.7-litre diesel engines, have also been available in China. As of 2019, the 2006 variant of the Jinbei Haise is still available for purchase with the 4G20, 4G21 and V19 petrol engines available as standard.

Belarus 
In Belarus, the MAZ-182 model is made based on the King Long Haise before it was phased out of production due to lack of interest with plans to eventually localize production. The first models (MAZ-181010 and MAZ-182010) were made in December 2010 before it was dropped in 2012, with surviving models found either being used for MAZ personnel or in the streets, some of them as ambulances. 

The models were publicly displayed in 2011.

Granvia, HiAce Regius, Grand HiAce, Touring HiAce (XH10, XH20) 
Sold in the Japanese market between 1995 and 2002, the Granvia is a semi-bonneted van, with the front wheels positioned in front of the front seats for better safety. Available with seven- and eight-seater configurations and in rear-wheel drive or four-wheel drive, it is based on the regular HiAce. Because of tighter safety regulations, this model replaced the mid-engined HiAce in Europe and several other markets. The engines for Granvia are either a 2.4 L or 3.0 L diesel, or 2.7- and 3.4 L petrol. The Granvia spawned into the upmarket multi-purpose vehicles the HiAce Regius, the Grand HiAce and the Touring HiAce. The Granvia, Grand HiAce, and Touring HiAce are upmarket passenger vans only.

In Europe, the Granvia-based HiAce sold from 1995 was usually equipped with the 2.5L 2KD-FTV diesel engine in a variety of versions. The HiAce underwent a facelift in 2006, with bigger "jewel-style" headlights, and continued to be built in this form until 2012, replaced by the Toyota ProAce.

In the UK market, the XH10 HiAce replaced the H100 HiAce and HiAce Compact in 1996 as a fifth generation model initially available with either the 2.4L 2L-II diesel developing 55 kW at 4000 rpm and 156 Nm at 2200 rpm alongside the 2.7L 3RZ-FE petrol engine developing 105 kW at 4800 rpm and 226 Nm at 2400 rpm. The 2.4L Diesel was replaced in November 2001 to comply with Euro Step III Emission standards by the 2KD-FTV in either Low Power variant producing  66 kW at 3800 rpm and 192  Nm at 1200-3000 rpm and High Power Variation producing 76 kW at 3600 rpm and 260 Nm at 1600-2400 rpm while the 2.7 Petrol would later be discontinued in 2004. In 2007 the engines were revised for Euro IV compliance with the addition of an intercooler improving max torque to  230 Nm at 1400-2800 rpm for the low power variant and 294 Nm at 1400-2400 rpm for the high power variant and power output to 70 kW and 85 kW respectively at 3600 rpm.

In Australia, the Granvia was sold as the HiAce SBV, alongside the fourth generation HiAce, and both were replaced by the new fifth generation model. The HiAce SBV sold in Australia (from 1996 to 2003) was designated RCH12R (short wheelbase) and RCH22R (long wheelbase) and was available only with 2.4-litre 2RZ-E petrol engine developing 88 kW at 4800 rpm and 200 Nm at 3600 rpm and five-speed manual transmission. The smaller SBV TownAce was powered by a 1.8-litre petrol engine.

They are also very popular in New Zealand, imported as used vehicles from Japan. The 3.0-litre turbocharged diesel is especially favoured as its enormous torque but not so impressive power output are ideally suited to the hilly conditions in a country with an overall 100 km/h speed limit. Many of these vehicles are in commercial passenger service.

The Grand HiAce was based on the HiAce Powervan. Sales of the Grand HiAce started in Japan in 1999. Engines available were a 3.4-litre petrol and a 3.0-litre turbodiesel. This type was sold in Japan only until 2002, when it was replaced by the Alphard. In Taiwan, the Granvia was badged HiAce Solemio.

The semi-bonneted HiAce was sold in Norway and was the best selling van for many years until 1 January 2012, when it was withdrawn the European market as it could not be made to pass the Euro 5 emissions rules.

The HiAce sold in Europe was replaced with a rebadged version of the Citroën Jumpy/Peugeot Expert/Fiat Scudo which is sold as the Toyota ProAce. It's made in cooperation with Jinbei as the Jinbei Granse (阁瑞斯 Geruisi) or Grace in English.

Fifth generation (H200; 2004) 

The fifth generation HiAce became available for sale in late 2004 as a wide long-wheelbase wagon, wide super-long-wheelbase high-roof "Grand Cabin", long-wheelbase van, long-wheelbase high-roof van and a wide super-long-wheelbase high-roof van. In this generation of the HiAce, the gear lever has been moved to the dashboard to enable easier movement in the cabin. Transmission choices range from a five-speed manual and four-speed automatic.

Most models use a four-cylinder DOHC engine, in a variety of forms, a 1TR-FE 2000 cc or 2TR-FE 2,700 cc petrol engine, or a 2KD-FTV 2,500 cc or 1KD-FTV 3,000 cc D-4D turbo-diesel engine. Two of these engines are available in Malaysia, the 2.5 L turbo-diesel, offered in a choice of panel van or window van; and the 2.7 L petrol, that comes only in the window van option. At least some general export market HiAces are powered by the 5L-E 3,000 cc diesel engine.

In Japan, Toyota's internet-enhanced GPS and vehicle telematics service called G-Book was made available as an option on all trim packages for both private and commercial uses.

The fifth generation HiAce was launched in the Philippines on 13 June 2005, with 2.5-litre 2KD engines; The 15-seater Commuter and the 13-seater GL Grandia, both with manual transmission. In March 2006, the new top-of-the-line 11-Seater HiAce Super Grandia was launched, being the first ever HiAce in the Philippines with a standard automatic transmission. In 2015, the 10-seater Super Grandia LXV was added in the HiAce lineup, based on the GL Grandia trim, the LXV was only offered with an automatic transmission and receives 15-inch alloy wheels, updated rear seats, higher roof (campervan) and a high end audio system. All HiAce trims in the Philippines was updated in October 2015 with the new 3.0-litre turbo-diesel 1KD engine. The GL Grandia and Super Grandia LXV trims were sold until April 2019 and the Super Grandia trim was sold until August 2019. The 3.0 Commuter model is still being sold alongside the H300 model. In May 2020, the 3.0 Cargo model was introduced.

This supplanted the 1KD-FTV.

On Japan's list of the most commonly stolen vehicles, the HiAce resides in the first place. Because of a lack of a theft immobilizer, it is fairly easy to steal a HiAce, as opposed to much more valuable SUVs and sports cars, which have more sophisticated theft deterrent systems.

Following the launch of the H300 series, the H200 series continues to be sold in certain markets , including in Japan, Philippines, Pakistan, Malaysia, Singapore, Indonesia and New Zealand. In 2020, Toyota Philippines introduced a variant of the H200 Commuter Van called the Hiace Cargo, which removes the rear seats but retains rear air conditioners and rear windows.

RegiusAce 
The second generation of the RegiusAce was completely restyled. Transmission choices are a 5-speed manual transmission or a 4-speed automatic, with the gearshift lever integrated into the instrument panel so as to allow front seat passengers access to the rear of the vehicle from the inside. A moderate restyle was completed in November 2005. It was discontinued in 2020 due to integration of all Toyota stores across Japan.

Mazda Bongo Brawny

In 2019, Mazda introduced a badge-engineered version of the H200 as the new Bongo Brawny. Unlike its predecessors, the new Bongo is meant for commercial purposes. It is offered in DX and GL trims.

The Brawny is equipped with collision avoidance package as standard with forward collision warning with automatic braking, automatic high beam, and lane departure warning.

Sixth generation (H300; 2019) 

The sixth generation HiAce made its global debut on 18 February 2019 in the Philippines. It uses a front hood/bonnet arrangement instead of a cab-over design, hence a departure from the design language of its predecessors. Its development was led by Toyota chief engineer Takuo Ishikawa.

The sixth generation HiAce is available in two engine options: a turbocharged 2.8 L 1GD-FTV inline-four diesel engine or a naturally aspirated 3.5 L 7GR-FKS V6 petrol engine.

Markets

Australia 
The sixth generation HiAce was released in Australia on 28 May 2019 and is offered in five grades: LWB Van, LWB Crew Van, SLWB Van, SLWB Commuter and SLWB Commuter GL. The 3.5L V6 engine option is only available on LWB & SLWB grades. A 6 Speed manual is only available in the LWB Van grade for both petrol and diesel engines.

Indonesia 
The sixth generation HiAce is sold in Indonesia as the HiAce Premio (based on long/high roof body), which was introduced at the 27th Gaikindo Indonesia International Auto Show in July 2019.

Philippines 
The sixth generation HiAce is offered in 5 trim levels: 15-seater Commuter Deluxe, 12-seater GL Grandia Monotone and 2-Tone, 14-seater GL Grandia Tourer, 10-seater Super Grandia and Super Grandia Elite. The Super Grandia trims are sold as the Granvia/Majesty in other markets. All trim levels are powered by the 2.8-litre turbodiesel engine mated to either a 6-speed manual or automatic transmissions.

Mexico 
The sixth generation HiAce was released in the Mexican market in late August 2019.

Thailand 
The sixth generation HiAce was launched in Thailand on 10 June 2019. There are three models of the HiAce in Thailand: HiAce (Normal Roof), Commuter (High Roof), and Majesty. The standard roof HiAce for Thai market is available in Eco (Panel Van) and GL grades, both with 6-speed manual transmission. The High-roof Commuter is available with both manual and automatic transmissions. The Majesty was launched on 16 August 2019, replacing the Ventury. It is offered in Standard, Premium and Grande grades, Toyota Safety Sense is standard on the Grande grade.

In January 2023, the automatic transmission option was added for the HiAce GL grade.

Gallery

GranAce/Granvia/Majesty/HiAce Super Grandia/HiAce VIP/Quantum VX 

A more luxurious passenger version of the HiAce, called Granvia, was released on 21 May 2019 and is sold in Taiwan and Australia (replacing the Tarago). The Granvia was also released in Thailand as the Majesty on 16 August 2019, replacing the Ventury, followed by the HiAce Super Grandia in the Philippines on 19 August 2019. It went on sale on 16 December 2019. The Granvia was launched in the United Arab Emirates on 10 October 2019 and is powered by the 3.5-litre V6 engine. It was also introduced in Russia as the HiAce VIP on 25 October 2019.

Engines

Safety

References

External links 

  (Japan)
  (Australia)

HiAce
Buses of Japan
Minibuses
Cab over vehicles
Vans
Pickup trucks
Cars introduced in 1967
1970s cars
1980s cars
1990s cars
2000s cars
2010s cars
2020s cars